The 1900–01 Scottish Districts season  is a record of all the rugby union matches for Scotland's district teams.

History

Edinburgh District beat Glasgow District in the Inter-City match. It was marked as a poor turnout; as the Edinburgh public had their fill of exciting rugby union matches recently. The poor weather didn't aid the turnout, and the North British Mail newspaper wondered how few the Inter-City turnout might have been, had not two trains full of Glasgow District fans made the journey east.

Results

Inter-City

Glasgow District:

Edinburgh District:

Other Scottish matches

North of Scotland:

South-West District: 

South of Scotland:

Anglo-Scots: 

Cities: A. W. Duncan (Edinburgh University); A. N. Fell (Edinburgh University), Phipps Turnbull (Edinburgh Academicals), John Tulloch (Kelvinside Academicals). W. H. Welsh (Edinburgh University); L. Greig (Glasgow Academicals), J. I. Gillespie (Edinburgh Academieals) ; M. C. Morrison (R.H.S.), J. M. Dykes (G.H.S.), R. S. Stronach (Glasgow Academicals), A. Frew, A. B. Flett (Edinburgh University), J. A. Bell (Clydesdale), W. P. Scott (West of Scotland), W. P. Dods (Edinburgh Academicals)

Provinces: W. Wilson (London Scottish); J. E. Crabbie (Oxford), H. A. Ross (London Scottish), J. Paterson (Hawick), G. O. Gould (Aberdeen Grammar School) ; J. Knox (Skipton), J. Middleton (London Scottish); D. R. Bedell-Sivright (Cambridge), J. Ross (London Scottish), W. Kyle (Hawick), J. G. Graham (Liverpool Old Boys), A. Mann (Stewart's College) F. C. Swanston, A. G. Cairns (Oxford), T. D. Murray (Panmure)

English matches

No other District matches played.

International matches

No touring matches this season.

References

1900–01 in Scottish rugby union
Scottish Districts seasons